Osinachi Marvis Ohale (born 21 December 1991) is a Nigerian professional footballer who plays as a centre back or right back for Spanish Liga F club Deportivo Alavés and the Nigeria women's national team.

Club career
Ohale played for Houston Dash in the National Women's Soccer League throughout the 2014 season before returning home to Nigeria with Rivers Angels.

In 2016, she joined Swedish Damallsvenskan side Vittsjö GIK, playing for the club on 22 occasions before transferring to Vaxjo DFF eighteen months later in August 2018.

On 11 September 2019, she signed for Spanish side CD Tacón on a permanent transfer, playing her first game for the club in a 3–0 victory over Sporting de Huelva just three days later.

On 30 July 2020, Ohale signed for A.S. Roma Women, the Nigeria international parted ways with Spanish side CD Tacon (now renamed Real Madrid), last month (June, 2020) after the expiration of her contract with the Primera Iberdrola outfit. She joined the Serie A Women's League outfit on a one-year deal for an undisclosed fee. Reacting to her historic move, Ohale told the club website: "I chose Roma because of so many things; so many amazing things about the club, about this city and this country that interested me".
"I felt like it would be a great thing for me, to explore and to experience new things and a new challenge".

International career
She represented Nigeria in the African Women's Championship tournaments of 2010, 2014, 2016 and 2018. She has won the competition on all four occasions.

She was also on the Nigerian squads of the FIFA Women's World Cup in 2011, 2015 and 2019.

Honours

Club
 Delta Queens FC
 Nigerian Women's Championship (2): 2011, 2012

International
 Nigeria
 Africa Women Cup of Nations (4): 2010, 2014, 2016, 2018

Individual
 IFFHS CAF Woman Team of the Decade 2011–2020

References

External links
 Osinachi Ohale at BDFútbol
 
 Profile at Houston Dash
 

1991 births
Living people
People from Owerri
Sportspeople from Imo State
Nigerian women's footballers
Women's association football central defenders
Women's association football fullbacks
Rivers Angels F.C. players
Delta Queens F.C. players
Houston Dash players
Vittsjö GIK players
Växjö DFF players
Real Madrid Femenino players
A.S. Roma (women) players
Madrid CFF players
National Women's Soccer League players
Damallsvenskan players
Primera División (women) players
Serie A (women's football) players
Nigeria women's international footballers
2011 FIFA Women's World Cup players
2015 FIFA Women's World Cup players
2019 FIFA Women's World Cup players
Nigerian expatriate women's footballers
Nigerian expatriate sportspeople in the United States
Expatriate women's soccer players in the United States
Nigerian expatriate sportspeople in Sweden
Expatriate women's footballers in Sweden
Nigerian expatriate sportspeople in Italy
Expatriate women's footballers in Italy
Nigerian expatriate sportspeople in Spain
Expatriate women's footballers in Spain
Deportivo Alavés Gloriosas players
Igbo sportspeople